Joseph Guillaume Bossé (born August 4, 1843 in Quebec, Canada East-died September 7, 1908) was a politician and lawyer. He was elected to the House of Commons of Canada in 1882 as a Member of the Conservative Party to represent the riding of Quebec-Centre. His father was Senator Joseph-Noël Bossé (1807–1881).

External links
 

1843 births
1908 deaths
Conservative Party of Canada (1867–1942) MPs
Members of the House of Commons of Canada from Quebec
Politicians from Quebec City